Alvise Mocenigo may refer to:

 Alvise I Mocenigo (1507–1577), doge of Venice, 1570–1577
 Alvise II Mocenigo (1628–1709), doge of Venice, 1700–1709
 Alvise Giovanni Mocenigo (1701–1778), doge of Venice, 1763–1778
 Sebastiano Mocenigo (Alvise III Sebastiano Mocenigo, 1662–1732), doge of Venice, 1722–1732

See also
 House of Mocenigo, a Venetian family